Edina Realty Home Services, based in Edina, Minnesota, is a Berkshire Hathaway affiliate and a wholly owned subsidiary of HomeServices of America, Inc. Edina Realty is the largest real estate company in Minnesota by sales volume and transaction sides. In 2016, the company conducted over 33,000 real estate transactions and $8.7 billion in sales volume.

Edina Realty has more than 75 real estate offices and 2,500 realtors operating in Minnesota and western Wisconsin. Edina Realty Home Services includes Edina Realty, Edina Realty Title, Edina Realty Mortgage and Edina Realty Relocation.

Background 
Edina Realty was established in 1955 by Emma Rovick.  The company's first real estate office was located at 50th and France Avenue in Edina, Minnesota.

The firm has acquired several real estate firms. During 2007 and 2008, Edina Realty acquired 17 real estate firms throughout the Midwest.

Leadership 
Greg Mason, President and CEO, Edina Realty Home Services

Sharry Schmid, President, Edina Realty

Joe Brown, President, Edina Realty Mortgage

Brad Fisher, President, Edina Realty Title

Other company affiliates 
Edina Realty Mortgage – Wholly owned subsidiary of HomeServices Lending and HomeServices of America, Inc., a Berkshire Hathaway affiliate. Founded in 1983, Edina Realty Mortgage is an Equal Housing Lender. NMLSR ID 490683.   

Edina Realty Title – 19 closing centers in Minnesota and western Wisconsin.

Edina Realty Insurance – Wholly owned comprehensive insurance provider for home, car and other belongings.

Edina Realty Foundation – A non-profit, private foundation supported through donated funds and volunteer time by Edina Realty sales associates, employees and Edina Realty Home Services. The foundation offers financial support to nonprofit organizations that work with the homeless or toward homelessness prevention. Since its inception in 1996, the Foundation has raised $9 million.

References

External links
 Edina Realty Website
 Edina Realty Fact Sheet

Companies based in Edina, Minnesota
Real estate companies established in 1955
Real estate services companies of the United States
Berkshire Hathaway